Rita Johnson  (1913 – 1965) was an American actress.

Rita Johnson may also refer to:
Rita Johnson, vocalist on works including Out of Order (Rod Stewart album)
Rita Johnson, honoree at 2010 Queen's Birthday Honours (Australia)
Rita Johnson, real name Marguerite Johnson, famous as Maya Angelou (1928-2014)

See also
Rita Johnston (born 1935), Canadian politician